Thomas Hellriegel (born 14 January 1971) a.k.a. "Hell on Wheels" is a German Ironman triathlete. His biggest achievement is winning the 1997 Ironman World Championship.  Hellriegel was also second in the event in 1995 (to Mark Allen) and 1996 (to Luc Van Lierde).

Hellriegel set the bike course record at the 1996 championship race with a time of 4:24:50; which had stood for 11 years, until Normann Stadler finished the bike course in a new record time at 4:18:23.

References

External links
 Thomas-Hellriegel website 

Ironman world champions
German male triathletes
1971 births
Living people
Sportspeople from Karlsruhe (region)
People from Bruchsal